Song of the Century may refer to:

 Song of the Century (Green Day song)
 Songs of the Century, a list